Lightman may refer to

People
Alan Lightman (born 1948), US physicist and writer
Gavin Lightman (1939-2020), English judge
Harold Lightman (1906-98), English barrister
John Lightman, US musician, member of Big Star
Stafford Lightman (born 1948), English doctor
Toby Lightman (born 1978), US singer-songwriter
Sari and Romy Lightman, members of the Canadian band Tasseomancy (band)

Fictional characters
Cal Lightman, character in the television series Lie to Me

Films
Lightman (film), is a Tamil film from Venkatesh Kumar.G